Çukuralan is the name of the following villages in Turkey:

 Çukuralanı, Dikili
 Çukuralan, Ağrı